Mount Pleasant is an unincorporated hamlet in Frederick County, Virginia, United States. Mount Pleasant is nestled between Hunting and Whisson Ridges on Wardensville Grade (VA 608).

References

Unincorporated communities in Frederick County, Virginia
Unincorporated communities in Virginia